Nine Thirty Curtain was a dramatic anthology television series which aired on the DuMont Television Network from October 16, 1953, to January 1, 1954. The 30-minute show aired on Fridays at 9:30 pm ET.

Episode status
As with most DuMont series, no episodes are known to survive.

See also
List of programs broadcast by the DuMont Television Network
List of surviving DuMont Television Network broadcasts
1953-54 United States network television schedule

References

Bibliography
David Weinstein, The Forgotten Network: DuMont and the Birth of American Television (Philadelphia: Temple University Press, 2004) 
Alex McNeil, Total Television, Fourth edition (New York: Penguin Books, 1980) 
Tim Brooks and Earle Marsh, The Complete Directory to Prime Time Network TV Shows, Third edition (New York: Ballantine Books, 1964)

External links
DuMont historical website
List of episodes at TVTango

DuMont Television Network original programming
1953 American television series debuts
1954 American television series endings
1950s American anthology television series
Black-and-white American television shows
Lost television shows